Three from St Cyr (French: Trois de St Cyr) is a 1939 French adventure film directed by Jean-Paul Paulin and starring Roland Toutain, Jean Mercanton and Jean Chevrier. It was part of a group of big budget war and spy stories made at the time, which enjoyed box office success in the period just before the Second World War broke out.

The film's sets were designed by the art directors Pierre Schild and Marcel Magniez.

Synopsis
Three graduates of the French military academy at St Cyr are posted to Syria where they become involved in the fight against rebels.

Cast
 Roland Toutain as Paul Parent 
 Jean Mercanton as Jean Le Moyne 
 Jean Chevrier as Pierre Mercier 
 Paul Amiot as Le général 
 Jean Worms as Le commandant Lenoir 
 Jean Parédès as Bréval 
 Maurice Marceau as Beaumont 
 Jean Fay as Le lieutenant Moulin 
 Chukry-Bey as Un chef de tribu 
 Hélène Perdrière as Françoise le Moyne 
 Léon Belières as M. Le Moyne

References

Bibliography 
 Crisp, Colin. Genre, Myth and Convention in the French Cinema, 1929-1939. Indiana University Press, 2002.

External links 
 

1939 films
1939 adventure films
French adventure films
1930s French-language films
Films directed by Jean-Paul Paulin
1930s French films